Three Brothers is an unincorporated community in northwestern Baxter County, Arkansas, United States.

The community is located on Arkansas Route 5 approximately three miles south of the Arkansas-Missouri state line. The site is situated on a ridge three miles northeast of an arm of Bull Shoals Lake and eight miles northwest of Mountain Home.

A post office called Three Brothers was established in 1912, and remained in operation until 1953. The community was named after nearby Three Brothers mountain which lie approximately 1.5 miles to the northwest along Route 5.

References

Unincorporated communities in Baxter County, Arkansas
Unincorporated communities in Arkansas